Ouaouizert, also Ouaouizaght or Ouaouizeght, is a town in Béni Mellal Province, Béni Mellal-Khénifra, Morocco. According to the 2004 census it has a population of 8,940.

References

Populated places in Béni Mellal Province